L.A. 7 (known as S Club 7 in L.A. in the United States) is the second series in the BBC television series starring British pop group S Club 7. The programme is shown every week on CBBC, from 6 April 2000 to 6 July 2000 and stars all seven members of the band as fictionalized versions of themselves. The series featured star from The Exorcist, Linda Blair as Joni, their landlord.

Like Miami 7, the show is renamed S Club 7 in L.A., and is shown on Fox Family in the United States, between 3 June 2000 and 30 September 2000. United Kingdom reruns of the show are occasionally aired, along with Miami 7, on now defunct cable channel Play UK.

Plot
The second series saw the group enter L.A. hoping to make it big. After leaving Howard and Marvin in Miami, the group bump into Joni (The Exorcist star Linda Blair) who offers to rent them an apartment after she accidentally runs over Bradley on her rollerblades.

Once in Los Angeles, the group have to quickly deal with some of the realities of trying to seek an existence in order to become a pop band. They also start to become more Americanized. In the final episode, they decide to pack up and hit the road after their manager apparently fails to get them a record deal.

Cast

Main
 Tina Barrett as Tina
 Paul Cattermole as Paul
 Jon Lee as Jon
 Bradley McIntosh as Bradley
 Jo O'Meara as Jo
 Hannah Spearritt as Hannah
 Rachel Stevens as Rachel
 Linda Blair as Joni Witherspoon

Recurring
 Paul Kreppel as Mr. Walters

Episodes

Specials

Video releases
L.A. 7 was released on video in 2000. It was released both as three individual cassettes or in a "Complete Boxset" containing all thirteen episodes. Unlike Miami 7, this series was never released in the United States on video, nor was it ever released on DVD in the United States or the United Kingdom due to low ratings.

References

External links 

 

S Club 7 television series
2000s British children's television series
2000 British television series debuts
2000 British television series endings
BBC children's television shows
Disney Channel original programming
British children's musical television series
Television shows set in Los Angeles
Fox Family Channel original programming
Television series by Endemol
Seven Network original programming
Television series based on singers and musicians